Schweitzer, also known as The Light in the Jungle, is a 1990 American film directed by Gray Hofmeyr and starring Malcolm McDowell and Susan Strasberg. It is about Albert Schweitzer's life in Africa.

Cast 
 Malcolm McDowell - Albert Schweitzer
 Susan Strasberg - Helene Schweitzer
 C. Andrew Davis - Dr. Lionel Curtis 
 Patrick Shai - Joseph
 John Carson - Horton Herschel
 Henry Cele - Oganga
 Helen Jessop - Amanda Hampton
 Mike Huff - Dr. Bergman 
 Barbara Nielsen - Rachel

References

External links 
 

1990 films
1990 drama films
Biographical films about religious leaders
Films set in Africa
Films set in the 1910s
Cultural depictions of Albert Schweitzer
1990s English-language films
American biographical films
1990s American films